Iwahara (written: 岩原) is a Japanese surname. Notable people with the surname include:

, Japanese ice hockey player
, Japanese volleyball player
, Japanese manga artist

See also
Mount Iwahara, a mountain of Hyōgo Prefecture, Japan
Iwahara Station, a railway station in Minamiashigara, Kanagawa Prefecture, Japan

Japanese-language surnames